Matthew Irwin (born November 29, 1987) is a Canadian professional ice hockey defenseman for the Washington Capitals of the National Hockey League (NHL). Irwin has previously played in the NHL for the San Jose Sharks, Boston Bruins, Nashville Predators, Anaheim Ducks and Buffalo Sabres.

Playing career

Amateur
He was named best defenceman in the British Columbia Hockey League Coastal Conference two years in a row, 2007 and 2008, while playing for the Nanaimo Clippers. He continued his career playing at the college level for the UMass Minutemen of Hockey East.

Professional

San Jose Sharks
As an undrafted free agent, Irwin agreed to a contract with the Worcester Sharks of the AHL. Irwin scored 73 points in his first two seasons, and was signed by parent affiliate, the San Jose Sharks after injuries to Jason Demers and Brent Burns.

Irwin scored his first NHL goal on January 26, 2013 against Semyon Varlamov of the Colorado Avalanche. In 38 games with the Sharks in 2013, Irwin scored six goals and six assists, while averaging 2.1 shots on goal per game, the most by a rookie defenceman.

On April 3, 2013, Irwin signed a two-year, $2 million contract extension with the Sharks.

Boston Bruins
On July 10, 2015, Irwin signed a one-year, $800,000 contract with the Boston Bruins. Irwin made the opening-night roster with Boston for the 2015–16 season. On October 11, 2015, Irwin was waived by Boston after a -5 plus/minus in his first two games. He was reassigned to Boston's AHL affiliate, the Providence Bruins, the following day.

Nashville Predators
On July 1, 2016, having concluded his contract with the Bruins, Irwin left as a free agent to sign a one-year, two-way contract worth $575,000 with the Nashville Predators. After a few months with the team, Irwin was signed to a one-year, $650,000 contract extension. Irwin spent majority of the season with the Predators, recording 14 points in 74 games. Irwin also appeared in 22 games for the team during the 2017 playoffs, where the Predators fell in six games to the Pittsburgh Penguins during the 2017 Stanley Cup Finals.

On January 9, 2018, the Predators re-signed Irwin to a two-year, $1.35 million contract extension.

Anaheim Ducks
On February 24, 2020, after making 27 appearances with the Predators, Irwin was dealt to the Ducks in exchange for Korbinian Holzer, along with a 2022 sixth-round pick. Irwin featured in 9 games on the Ducks blueline, registering 1 assist, before the season was paused and effectively ended for the Ducks due to the COVID-19 pandemic.

Buffalo Sabres
As a free agent from the Ducks, Irwin agreed to a one-year, $700,000 contract to join his fifth NHL club in the Buffalo Sabres on October 9, 2020. In the pandemic delayed  season, Irwin made 24 regular season appearances on the blueline for the cellar-dwelling Sabres, registering just 2 assists.

Washington Capitals
Irwin continued his journeyman career in the following off-season, leaving the Sabres to sign as a free agent on a one-year, two-way contract with the Washington Capitals on July 28, 2021.

Career statistics

Awards and honours

References

External links

 

1987 births
Anaheim Ducks players
Boston Bruins players
Buffalo Sabres players
Canadian ice hockey defencemen
Ice hockey people from British Columbia
Living people
Milwaukee Admirals players
Nanaimo Clippers players
Nashville Predators players
People from the Capital Regional District
Providence Bruins players
San Jose Sharks players
Sportspeople from Victoria, British Columbia
Undrafted National Hockey League players
UMass Minutemen ice hockey players
Washington Capitals players
Worcester Sharks players